Sir William Masham, 1st Baronet (c. 1592 – c. 1656) was an English politician who sat in the House of Commons variously between 1624 and 1655.

Life
Masham was the only son of William Masham of St Botolph without Aldgate, London and educated at Magdalen College, Oxford (1607) and the Inner Temple (1610).

Masham was created baronet on 20 December 1621. He was elected Member of Parliament for Maldon in 1624, 1625 and 1626 and for Colchester in place of Edward Alford in 1628 after a petition.

In April 1640, Masham was elected MP for Colchester in the Short Parliament and then for Essex in November 1640 for the Long Parliament.  He was re-elected MP for Essex in 1654 for the First Protectorate Parliament.

He married Elizabeth, the daughter of Joan and Sir Francis Barrington of Hatfield Broad Oak, Essex, and the widow of Sir James Altham of Mark Hall, Latton, Essex. They had three sons (of whom at least one predeceased him) and a daughter.

References

 

1590s births
1650s deaths
Alumni of Magdalen College, Oxford
Members of the Inner Temple
Baronets in the Baronetage of England
English MPs 1624–1625
English MPs 1625
English MPs 1626
English MPs 1628–1629
English MPs 1640 (April)
English MPs 1640–1648
English MPs 1654–1655
Members of Parliament for Maldon